Kirsten Normann Andersen (born 28 April 1962 in Aarhus) is a Danish politician, who is a member of the Folketing for the Socialist People's Party. She entered parliament in 2016, after Jonas Dahl resigned his seat.

Political career
Andersen ran in the 2015 Danish general election where she received 2,149 personal votes. Although this did not secure her a seat in parliament, she became the Socialist People's Party's primary substitute in the Østjylland constituency. When Jonas Dahl resigned his seat on 8 August 2016, Andersen entered parliament in his place. She served the remaining of the 2015-2019 term. She was elected into the Folketing at the 2019 election, receiving 7,885 personal votes.

External links 
 Biography on the website of the Danish Parliament (Folketinget)

References 

Living people
1962 births
Politicians from Aarhus
21st-century Danish women politicians
Women members of the Folketing
Socialist People's Party (Denmark) politicians
Members of the Folketing 2015–2019
Members of the Folketing 2019–2022
Members of the Folketing 2022–2026